The Battle of Fort Cachimán, was a major battle of the Dominican War of Independence and was fought on the 6 December 1844 at the border close to Elías Piña. A force of Dominican troops, a portion of the Army of the South, led by General Antonio Duvergé, defeated an outnumbering force of the Haitian Army led by General Seraphin and captured the Haitian fort.

References

Fort Cachiman
Fort Cachimán
December 1844 events